HD 162020 is a star in the southern constellation of Scorpius with a likely red dwarf companion. It has an apparent visual magnitude of 9.10, which is too faint to be visible to the naked eye. The distance to this system is 101 light years based on stellar parallax. It is drifting closer to the Sun with a radial velocity of −27 km/s, and is predicted to come to within ~ in 1.1 million years.

This is an ordinary K-type main-sequence star with a stellar classification of K3V. The age estimate is poorly constrained but it appears to have an intermediate age of several billion years. However, the activity level suggests a younger star; the rotation rate of the star may have been increased through synchronization with the companion, resulting in a higher than normal activity for its age. X-ray emission has been detected from this star.

HD 162020 has 74% of the mass of the Sun and 73% of the Sun's radius. The abundance of iron is roughly the same as the Sun, suggesting a similar metallicity. It is radiating just 25.8% of the luminosity of the Sun from its photosphere at an effective temperature of 4,801 K. The star is spinning with a projected rotational velocity of 1.9 km/s.

Companion

At the time of discovery, the actual mass was undetermined since the orbital inclination was not known. The object's distance from the star ranges from 0.054 to 0.096 AU. It has an extremely high semi-amplitude of 1,813 km/s. The discovery was announced on April 15, 2000 by the Geneva Extrasolar Planet Search Team.

Despite the presence of this massive object in an eccentric orbit around the star, computer modelling done in 2017 (when the object was still thought to be a brown dwarf) shows it is still theoretically possible for an Earth-mass exoplanet to be occupying a dynamically-stable orbit in the habitable zone of this star.

An astrometric measurement of this object's inclination and true mass was published in 2022 as part of Gaia DR3, revealing it to be  and thus likely a red dwarf star.

References

External links
 
 

K-type main-sequence stars
Red dwarfs
Binary stars

Scorpius (constellation)
Durchmusterung objects
162020
087330